Fog Island is a 1945 American mystery-suspense film directed by Terry O. Morse. The film stars B movie horror film regulars George Zucco and Lionel Atwill. It was based on the 1937 play Angel Island by Bernadine "Bernie" Angus.

Plot
A recent ex convict named Leo Grainer lives secluded on Fog Island with the daughter of his murdered wife. Seeking to learn who murdered her, and to exact revenge on those who framed him and destroyed his business, he invites his former associates to his creepy island mansion on the pretext he may share a hidden fortune with them.

Prior to their arrival he rigs the mansion with secret passages and a trap. Then, once his guests arrive, he gives each a clue, including his step daughter and butler. This successfully pits everyone against the others and plays on their greed. What then transpires is conflict, revealed mysteries, sudden death, and an unlikely resolution.

Cast
Lionel Atwill as Alec Ritchfield
George Zucco as Leo Grainer
Jerome Cowan as Kavanaugh
Sharon Douglas as Gail
Veda Ann Borg as Sylvia
 John Whitney as Jeff
Jacqueline deWit as Emiline Bronson
Ian Keith as Dr. Lake
George Lloyd as Allerton - Butler

Production
The rights to the play on which the film was based had been sold by The New York World-Telegram for $30,000 dollars. But, this is highly suspect as it became a PRC Release and the studio would only give less than $200 to writers for the final script. The film's sets were designed by the art director Paul Palmentola.

Soundtrack
 Sharon Douglas and Karl Hajos - "Liebestraum (Love's Dream)" by Franz Liszt.

Critical reception
Allmovie noted "An early low-budget spin on Ten Little Indians," calling it "cheap but entertaining."

References

External links

Review of film at Variety

1945 films
1945 horror films
American mystery films
American black-and-white films
Producers Releasing Corporation films
American films based on plays
1945 mystery films
American horror films
Films scored by Karl Hajos
1940s English-language films
1940s American films